The Veterans Company of the Imperial Guard was a veterans and invalides unit of the French Imperial Guard serving under Napoléon Bonaparte in the Napoleonic Wars.  The company was formed initially in July 1804 at the strength of one company, but in 1811 was expanded to two companies and became known as the Veterans of the Imperial Guard.  The unit was finally disbanded in July 1814 following the restoration of the Bourbons.

History 

On 12 July 1801, First Consul Napoléon passed a decree which formed the Veterans Company of the Consular Guard.  This company was based just outside of Paris at the Palace of Versailles.  The establishment of the unit was as follows (in English): 1 x battalion chief (local rank of captain), 1 x lieutenant, 2 x second lieutenants, 1 x sergeant major, 4 x sergeants, 1 x quartermaster, 8 x corporals, 2 x drummers, and 120 x soldiers.

After formation, the company was commanded by a Chef de Bataillon (equivalent to the English Lieutenant Colonel), which on formation was Chef Henri François Marie Charpentier.  In 1804, the company omitted the term 'Consular', and replaced it with 'Imperial' following the Coronation of Napoleon in May.  Following the unit's move into the Imperial Guard, a new felt hat was issued adorned with a red-white-blue coloured cockade.

In 1811, the company was expanded to two companies and  subsequently redesignated as the Veterans of the Imperial Guard.  The company only saw action once, during the Battle of Paris in April 1814, where it defended the Neuilly-sur-Seine bridge.  Rather unusually, under the terms of the Treaty of Fontainebleau, the company was allowed to be retained including being allowed to maintain its weapons and magazine.  The company was disbanded on 1 July 1814 following the First Bourbon Restoration.

On 15 May 1814, the company was attached to the 1st (Old Guard) Division, part of the Imperial Guard Corps in Napoleon's main army.  The company's strength was 3 officers and 132 other ranks for a total of 135 men.

Uniform 
The uniform of the veterans was similar to that of the 1st and 2nd Grenadier Regiments: 'republican blue' coatee with blue collar without piping, red square-ended lapels, also without piping; red cuffs with blue patches, red skirt lining with yellow grenades in the corners, cross pocket flaps piped red; yellow metal buttons; red epaulettes, and white waistcoats and breeches.  The cap was a bicorne with a red pom-pom, and tricolour cockade.  The cap had a red back with a white grenade imposed on-top.  A copper grenade was ornamented on the flap of the cartridge box.

Footnotes

References 

 

 
 

Military units and formations established in 1804
1804 establishments in France
Military units and formations disestablished in 1814
1814 disestablishments in France
Regiments of Napoleon I's Imperial Guard
French military units and formations of the Napoleonic Wars